Burbunga is a genus of cicadas in the family Cicadidae, found in Australia. There are about 11 described species in Burbunga.

Burbunga is the only genus of the tribe Burbungini.

Species
These 11 species belong to the genus Burbunga:
 Burbunga albofasciata Distant, 1907
 Burbunga aterrima Distant, 1914
 Burbunga gilmorei (Distant, 1882)
 Burbunga hillieri (Distant, 1907)
 Burbunga inornata Distant, 1905
 Burbunga mouldsi Olive, 2012
 Burbunga nanda (Burns, 1964)
 Burbunga nigrosignata (Distant, 1904)
 Burbunga occidentalis (Distant, 1912)
 Burbunga parva Moulds, 1994
 Burbunga queenslandica Moulds, 1994

References

Further reading

 
 
 
 
 
 
 
 
 

Cicadinae
Cicadidae genera